Marco Tulio Lopes Silva also known as "Tula" (born February 28, 1981) is a Brazilian footballer who was play as an attacking midfielder.

Career
Marco Túlio previously played for Albirex Niigata in Japan in the J2 League as well as Debreceni VSC in the Hungarian National Championship I, Club Jorge Wilstermann in Bolivia, Kazma in Kuwait,  Clube Atlético Mineiro in the Campeonato Brasileiro Série A and for Ethnikos Piraeus in the Greek Beta Ethniki.
Tulio Played for PFC Lokomotiv Mezdra in the Bulgarian A PFG in 2009 but left in January 2010 in order to return to Brazil, signing with Uberlandia Esporte Clube.

On 1 March 2012 he signed for T-Team FC in Malaysia. After a season with Malta's Tarxien Rainbows F.C., Tulio was back in Malaysia when he signed for Perak FA in April 2014, as a mid-season foreign player replacement for Kyaw Zayar Win. His debut for Perak on 19 April 2014, in a league game against Terengganu FA, also had him score his first goal for Perak in a 2-0 win.

References

External links

 
Interview with Marco Túlio
 Official site

1981 births
Living people
Brazilian footballers
Brazilian expatriate footballers
Ethnikos Piraeus F.C. players
Debreceni VSC players
Perak F.C. players
PFC Lokomotiv Mezdra players
Albirex Niigata players
Uberlândia Esporte Clube players
Turan-Tovuz IK players
Terengganu F.C. II players
Tarxien Rainbows F.C. players
Sabah F.C. (Malaysia) players
Brazilian expatriate sportspeople in Kuwait
Expatriate footballers in Greece
Expatriate footballers in Japan
Expatriate footballers in Hungary
Expatriate footballers in Kuwait
Expatriate footballers in Bulgaria
Expatriate footballers in Malaysia
Campeonato Brasileiro Série A players
J2 League players
First Professional Football League (Bulgaria) players
Football League (Greece) players
Nemzeti Bajnokság I players
Association football midfielders
Brazilian expatriate sportspeople in Bulgaria
Brazilian expatriate sportspeople in Greece
Brazilian expatriate sportspeople in Malaysia
Brazilian expatriate sportspeople in Japan
Brazilian expatriate sportspeople in Hungary
Kazma SC players
Kuwait Premier League players